Paluru is a village in West Godavari district in the state of Andhra Pradesh in India.

Demographics
 India census, Paluru has a population of 2887 of which 1451 are males while 1436 are females. The average sex ratio of Paluru village is 990. The child population is 288, which makes up 9.98% of the total population of the village, with sex ratio 1014. In 2011, the literacy rate of Paluru village was 72.30% when compared to 67.02% of Andhra Pradesh.

See also 
 Eluru

References 

Villages in West Godavari district